The Odette School of Business (OSB) is the business school of the University of Windsor in Windsor, Ontario. The school offers various programs with focus in Accounting, Human Resources, Finance, Supply Chain and Business Analytics, Marketing, and Strategy and Entrepreneurship. Odette School of Business is accredited by the Association to Advance Collegiate Schools of Business  (AACSB).

Applicants do not need to have professional experience, but a Graduate Management Admission Test (GMAT) score of 550 is required.

History

The Odette School of Business traces its beginnings to 1953, when Dr. Gilbert Horne, later to become the first dean of business, established the Department of Business Administration as a distinct unit from the Department of Economics. In 1955, the first graduating class of the three-year Bachelor of Commerce program had degrees conferred upon them; they were a class of sixteen students. The first Honours Bachelor of Commerce class graduated in 1960, followed in 1963 by the first MBA class

In 1964, the Department became the Faculty of Business Administration. Dr. Michael Zin, having graduated from the first graduating class, was named the second dean of the business school in 1973 and in 1978 the Faculty of Business Administration moved into what is now the Education Building at Fanchette Street and Sunset Avenue.

In 1991, the faculty moved into a landmark new Odette Building on the corner of Wyandotte Street West and Sunset Avenue. The Faculty was later renamed the Odette School of Business in 2000, in honour of long-standing supporters Edmond and Louis Odette.

Notable alumni
 Chuck Magro, President and CEO of Nutrien
 Richard Peddie, President and CEO of Maple Leaf Sports & Entertainment
Sergio Marchionne, CEO of Fiat Chrysler Automobiles
Trevor Georgie, President and General Manager of the Saint John Sea Dogs
Tracey Stockwell, CFO of Universal Orlando

References

|coor = 

Business schools in Canada
Postmodern architecture in Canada
University of Windsor